Fuel crisis may refer to:

 1947 fuel crisis, in the United Kingdom
 1973 oil crisis
 1979 energy crisis
 2012 United Kingdom fuel crisis
 2012 fuel crisis in the Gaza Strip
 2015 Nepal fuel crisis
 2021 United Kingdom fuel supply crisis
 2021 United Kingdom natural gas supplier crisis

See also
 Energy crisis